LVHS Pothencode aka Lekshmi Vilasom High School Pothencode is a school in Thiruvananthapuram Education district.
It was founded by Murukkumpuzha Anantha Bhavan Sree Kunjan Muthalali in the name of his mother Smt Lekshmi in 1964. The present manager of the school is Sri K Prabhullachandran. 
The school is located in Karoor ward of Pothencode panchayat at a distance of about 20 km from Thiruvananthapuram, the capital city of Kerala.

The school which began with 168 students in standard 8th with a few staff headed by Sri P C Nadar Sir the first head master has now grown to a strength of about 2000 students in standards 8th 9th and 10th with nearly 75 staff members.
The new block of the school was inaugurated on 29 June 1965 by Kerala Chief Minister R Shankar.

References

Schools in Thiruvananthapuram district
Educational institutions established in 1964
1964 establishments in Kerala